Jesse Collins (born December 9, 1961) is a Canadian actor and director. He is best known for starring in the television series Katts and Dog. He was nominated for a Daytime Emmy Award in 2000 for his direction of the PBS series Zoboomafoo. He voiced Sandy Beach in the TV series Rescue Heroes. His other credits include Cyberchase, Storm Hawks, World of Quest, Babar and the Adventures of Badou, The Berenstain Bears, Arthur, Noddy, George Shrinks, and Slugterra.

Filmography

Film

Television

References

External links
 

1961 births
Living people
Canadian male television actors
Male actors from Toronto
Canadian male voice actors
Canadian male film actors